Corumbiara (English: Corumbiara: They Shoot Indians, Don't They?) is a 2009 Brazilian documentary film, directed by Vincent Carelli (pt). The film won three awards at 37th Gramado Film Festival including Best Picture.

Content 
A then-50-something man, living alone in the Amazon, for 22 years, after the last of his tribe,   a group of six members, were murdered by farmers in 1995, was photographed by a filmmaker who accompanied FUNAI on a monitoring trip and is shown very briefly in this documentary. Monte Reel wrote The Last of the Tribe: The Epic Quest to Save a Lone Man in the Amazon about him.

Awards 
Gramado Film Festival
Best Picture
Best Direction
Best Film Editing

14th São Paulo International Documentary Festival
Honorable Mention

IV São Paulo Latin American Film Festival
Best Picture (Popular Jury)

Montreal First Peoples' Festival
Best Documentary

See also 
 Ishi
 slaughter of Corumbiara,

References

External links 
Corumbiara on IMDb

Age-restricted YouTube videos:
https://www.youtube.com/watch?v=euf22JLqlFE
https://www.youtube.com/watch?v=agPfrSRMTEc
https://www.youtube.com/watch?v=heKdYrMDpG8

Brazilian documentary films
2009 films
2000s Portuguese-language films
2009 documentary films